Gerry Hambling (14 June 1926 – 5 February 2013) was a British film editor whose work is credited on 49 films; he had also worked as a sound editor and a television editor. Hambling's editing of three films, The Commitments (1991), Mississippi Burning (1988), and Midnight Express (1978), has been honored by BAFTA Awards for Best Editing.

In 1976, Hambling began a notable collaboration with the director Alan Parker that extended over nearly all of Parker's films. The three BAFTA awards noted above were all for films directed by Parker. Chris Routledge has described their collaboration as follows:

In addition to the three BAFTA Awards, Hambling had been nominated for the BAFTA award for three additional films (Fame, Another Country, and Evita). Six films edited by Hambling were nominated for the Academy Award for Best Film Editing (Midnight Express, Fame, Mississippi Burning, The Commitments, In the Name of the Father, and Evita). Hambling had been elected to membership in the American Cinema Editors. Mississippi Burning won the ACE Eddie Award, and in 1998 Hambling was honored with the American Cinema Editors Career Achievement Award.

He died in 2013 at the age of 86.

Filmography
The director of each film is indicated in parenthesis.
1956    Dry Rot (Elvey)
1958    The Whole Truth (Guillermin)
1958    Sally's Irish Rogue (Pollock)
1959    Left Right and Centre (Gilliat)
1960    The Bulldog Breed (Asher)
1961    The Kitchen (Hill)
1962    She'll Have to Go (also known as Maid for Murder) (Asher)
1963    A Stitch in Time (Asher)
1965    The Early Bird (Asher); The Intelligence Men (Asher)
1966    Press for Time (Asher); That Riviera Touch (Owen)
1967    The Magnificent Two (Owen)
1969    The Adding Machine (Epstein)
1970    Some Will, Some Won't (Wood)
1976    Bugsy Malone (Parker)
1977    The Brute (O'Hara)
1978    Midnight Express (Parker)
1980    Fame (Parker)
1981    Heartaches (Shebib)
1982    Pink Floyd – The Wall (Parker); Shoot the Moon (Parker)
1984    Another Country (Kanievska); Birdy (Parker)
1985    Invitation to the Wedding (Brooks)
1986    Absolute Beginners (Temple)
1987    Angel Heart (Parker); Leonard Part 6 (Weiland)
1988    Mississippi Burning (Parker)
1989    Fragments of Isabella (O'Leary)
1990    Come See the Paradise (Parker)
1991    The Commitments (Parker)
1992    City of Joy (La Cité de la joie) (Joffé)
1993    In the Name of the Father (Sheridan)
1994    The Road to Wellville (Parker)
1996    Evita  (Parker); White Squall (Scott)
1997    The Boxer (Sheridan)
1998    Talk of Angels (Hamm)
1999    Angela's Ashes (Parker)
2002    Mrs Caldicot's Cabbage War (Sharp)
2003    The Life of David Gale (Parker)

See also
List of film director and editor collaborations

References

Further reading
 This short biographical article notes Don Fairservice's analysis of Hambling's editing in Mississippi Burning.

External links

1926 births
2013 deaths
American Cinema Editors
Best Editing BAFTA Award winners
British film editors